The 2016–17 Elon Phoenix men's basketball team represented Elon University during the 2016–17 NCAA Division I men's basketball season. The Phoenix, led by eighth-year head coach Matt Matheny, played their home games at Alumni Gym in Elon, North Carolina as third-year members of the Colonial Athletic Association. They finished the season 18–14, 10–8 in CAA play to finish in a tie for fourth place. As the No. 5 seed in the CAA tournament, they lost in the quarterfinals to William & Mary.

Previous season
The Phoenix finished the 2015–16 season 16–16, 7–11 in CAA play to finish in eighth place. They lost in the first round of the CAA tournament to Drexel.

Offseason

Departures

2016 recruiting class

2017 recruiting class

Roster

Schedule and results

|-
!colspan=9 style="| Exhibition

|-
!colspan=9 style=| Non-conference regular season

|-
!colspan=9 style=| CAA regular season

|-
!colspan=9 style=| CAA tournament

See also
2016–17 Elon Phoenix women's basketball team

References

Elon Phoenix men's basketball seasons
Elon